The Perfect Is The Enemy Of The Good is the second full-length album for the band Burnt by the Sun, released on Relapse Records.

The title is a common translation of a quotation by Voltaire:
Le mieux est l'ennemi du bien.
Literally,
The best is the enemy of the good.
From La Bégueule (1772).

Track listing
 "Abril Los Ojos"
 "Washington Tube Steak"
 "Battleship"
 "Forlani"
 "180 Proof"
 "Untitled"
 "Arrival Of Niburu"
 "Patient 957"
 "2012"
 "Untitled"
 "Spinner Dunn"
 "Pentagons And Pentagrams"
 "Revelations 101"
 "Untitled"

Personnel
Mike Olender- Vocals
John Adubato - Guitar
Ted Patterson - Bass
Dave Witte - Drums

References

Burnt by the Sun (band) albums
2003 albums